Mohamed El Gourch (11 January 1936 – 21 February 2015) was a Moroccan road racing cyclist who won the Tour du Maroc, a record three times, in 1960, 1964 and 1965. He was also second in 1967, and was third in 1968 and 1969. He competed in the individual road race and team time trial events at the 1960 Summer Olympics. Gourch died in February 2015 after suffering a heart attack. He was 79.

References

1936 births
2015 deaths
Moroccan male cyclists
Sportspeople from Casablanca
Road racing cyclists
Olympic cyclists of Morocco
Cyclists at the 1960 Summer Olympics
20th-century Moroccan people
21st-century Moroccan people